Chhathar Jorpati is a rural municipality (gaunpalika) out of four rural municipality located in Dhankuta District of Province No. 1 of Nepal. There are a total of 7 municipalities in Dhankuta in which 3 are urban and 4 are rural.

To form this new Rural Municipality Hathikharka, Tankhuwa, Telia and Parewadin were merged, which previously were all separate Village development committee (local level administrative villages). Fulfilling the requirement of the new Constitution of Nepal 2015, Ministry of Federal Affairs and Local Development replaced all old VDCs and Municipalities into 753 new local level body (Municipality).

The Gaunpalika is divided into 6 wards and the Tankhuwa is the Headquarter of this newly formed rural municipality.

Demographics
At the time of the 2011 Nepal census, Chhathar Jorpati Rural Municipality had a population of 18,322. Of these, 44.4% spoke Nepali, 31.6% Limbu, 11.3% Magar, 4.3% Tamang, 2.3% Sherpa, 2.2% Newar, 1.2% Gurung, 1.0% Rai, 0.7% Bhujel and 1.0% other languages as their first language.

In terms of ethnicity/caste, 32.3% were Limbu, 25.1% Chhetri, 11.6% Magar, 5.5% Hill Brahmin, 4.8% Tamang, 3.8% Newar, 2.8% Kami, 2.7% Sherpa, 2.5% Gurung and 8.9% others.

In terms of religion, 47.1% were Hindu, 31.4% Kirati, 18.9% Buddhist, 1.7% Christian, 0.5% Prakriti and 0.4% others.

References

External links
 Official website
 Final District 1-75 Corrected Last for RAJPATRA

Rural municipalities in Koshi Province
Populated places in Dhankuta District
Rural municipalities of Nepal established in 2017
Rural municipalities in Dhankuta District